Edouard Millaire (September 18, 1882 – November 16, 1949) was an amateur and later professional ice hockey player from 1898 until 1912. He is one of the first francophone players to play in senior-level ice hockey in Canada, the sport having been dominated to that time by the anglophone community in Montreal. He is an original Montreal Canadiens player.

Playing career
Millaire played junior hockey for Montreal St. Mary's College from 1898 until 1902. He started medical training at Laval University and did not return to hockey until the 1904-05 season, playing with the Montreal Montagnards of the Federal Amateur Hockey League, for which he played two seasons as well as being a member of the Laval team. He played one professional season 1909-10 for the Montreal Canadiens.

Personal life
Millaire completed his studies at Laval and became a medical doctor. He died in Godbout, Quebec in 1949.

See also
 National Hockey Association
 1910 NHA season

References

1882 births
1949 deaths
Physicians from Quebec
Montreal Canadiens (NHA) players
Université Laval alumni
Canadian ice hockey players